Tingun is a rural locality in the Maranoa Region, Queensland, Australia. In the  Tingun had a population of 157 people.

Geography 
The Western railway line forms the northern boundary of the locality.

Road infrastructure
The Warrego Highway runs along the northern boundary, and the Carnarvon Highway runs through from north-west to south-east.

History 

The area was home to the Yalebone Provisional School from 1911 to about 1925.  

The Trenhed branch of the Western Division of the Queensland Country Women's Association operated in the area between at least 1938 and 1951. 

There are many state forests in the area including Trinidad, Brucedale, Tinowon, and Yalebone.  

In the  Tingun had a population of 157 people.

References 

Maranoa Region
Localities in Queensland